Abraham Russell Ponder House is a historic home located at Cape Girardeau, Missouri.  It was built in 1905, and is a two-story, Classical Revival style brick dwelling.  It has a hipped roof with a moderate overhang with decorative brackets and a wide frieze with dentil molding.  It features a central two-story, double-tiered pedimented portico supported by full height fluted Ionic order columns and pilasters.

It was listed on the National Register of Historic Places in 2008.

References

Houses on the National Register of Historic Places in Missouri
Neoclassical architecture in Missouri
Houses completed in 1905
Houses in Cape Girardeau County, Missouri
National Register of Historic Places in Cape Girardeau County, Missouri
1905 establishments in Missouri